Ushiomaru Motoyasu (born Motoyasu Sano; May 11, 1978 – December 13, 2019) was a sumo wrestler from Shizuoka, Japan. He began his professional career in 1994 and first reached the top division in 2002. His highest rank was maegashira 10.  He retired in May 2009 to take over the Azumazeki stable.

Career
Ushiomaru made his debut in March 1994, joining Azumazeki stable. He began using the fighting name of Takamisano, switching briefly to Tenfuku before adopting his familiar name in November 1995. In his early career in the lower ranks, he served as a tsukebito, or personal attendant, to yokozuna Akebono. After a long stint in the third makushita division, he reached sekitori status by winning promotion to the second jūryō division in January 2002. After winning the jūryō division title in July of that year with a 13-2 record, he was promoted to the top makuuchi division for the next tournament. He was injured during his second top division tournament and had to withdraw, resulting in demotion back to the second division. He struggled in 2005, losing sekitori status on two occasions, but then made something of a comeback, returning to the top division for four straight tournaments from November 2006 to May 2007.

He was one of the few high ranking sumo wrestlers from Shizuoka Prefecture, which has not supplied nearly as many new entrants as the colder northern parts of Japan such as Aomori and Hokkaidō. When he reached the top division in 2002 he was the first wrestler from Shizuoka Prefecture to do so since Katsunishiki, who spent just one tournament in makuuchi in January 1976. (He has since been followed by Katayama, Sagatsukasa and Midorifuji.)

Retirement from sumo
In 2007, the head coach and founder of Azumazeki stable, former sekiwake Takamiyama, indicated that Ushiomaru would succeed him when he reached the mandatory retirement age of sixty-five in June 2009. This came as a surprise to some, who had assumed that his more high profile and higher ranked stablemate Takamisakari would take over. After completing his last match in the May, 2009 tournament, Ushiomaru did announce his retirement from active sumo to take over head coach duties from the retiring Kuhaulua. He assumed the name Onogawa until 16 June when Kuhaulua officially retired and he became Azumazeki Oyakata. His danpatsu-shiki, or official retirement ceremony, was held at the Ryōgoku Kokugikan on 31 January 2010. Takamisakari remained an active wrestler until January 2013, when he announced his retirement. He  then assisted Ushiomaru in running Azumazeki stable under the elder name of Furiwake. In February 2018 Azumazeki moved his stable to new premises in Shibamata District, Katsushika.

Death
On December 13, 2019, he died of angiosarcoma in the Azumazeki stable in Shibamata, Tokyo, aged 41. A tsuya (wake) was held at Azumazeki stable on December 18  with Akebono, for whom Ushiomaru was a tsukebito, in attendance despite ill health. The funeral was held on  December 19, with the former Azumazeki Oyakata (ex-Takamiyama) attending and the chair of the Sumo Association Hakkaku giving the memorial address. Takamisakari was confirmed as Ushiomaru's successor to the Azumazeki stable in January 2020.

Family
Ushiomaru was married, and the couple's child, a daughter, was born in January 2018.

Fighting style
Ushiomaru preferred oshi-sumo or pushing and thrusting techniques to fighting on the mawashi. His most common winning kimarite were  oshi-dashi or push out, and yori-kiri or force out, which together accounted for nearly half his career victories.

Career record

See also
Glossary of sumo terms
List of sumo tournament second division champions
List of past sumo wrestlers
List of sumo elders

References

External links
 

1978 births
2019 deaths
Japanese sumo wrestlers
People from Shizuoka (city)
Sumo people from Shizuoka Prefecture
Deaths from cancer in Japan
Deaths from blood cancer